Frank Shurden (born October 8, 1940) is an American politician who served in the Oklahoma House of Representatives from the 16th district from 1978 to 1986 and in the Oklahoma Senate from the 8th district from 1986 to 2006.

References

1940 births
Living people
Democratic Party members of the Oklahoma House of Representatives
Democratic Party Oklahoma state senators